Nikolay Dmitriyevich Moiseyev (December 3(16), 1902 in Perm –  December 6, 1955 in Moscow) was a Soviet astronomer and expert in celestial mechanics. In 1938, he became the chairman of the department of celestial mechanics at Moscow State University and worked on this position until his death. His main works were devoted to mathematical methods of celestial calculations and theory of comet formation.

He also taught higher mathematics in Zhukovsky Military Academy and was a colonel-engineer of Air forces. He was the director of State Astronomic Institute named by Sternberg (1939-1943) and organized the national system of radio-signals for the exact time.

His awards include Order of Lenin, Order of the Great Patriotic War and two Red Stars.

The crater Moiseev on the Moon is named after him. A minor planet 3080 Moisseiev discovered by Soviet astronomer Pelageya Shajn in 1935 is named after him.

External links
 Biography of Nikolay Moiseyev

1902 births
1955 deaths
People from Perm, Russia
People from Permsky Uyezd
Russian astronomers
Soviet astronomers
Moscow State University alumni
Recipients of the Order of Lenin
Burials at Vagankovo Cemetery